Alena Saili (born 13 December 1998) is a New Zealand rugby sevens player.

Saili joined the Black Ferns Sevens in 2017. She won a gold medal at the 2018 Commonwealth Games. She competed at the 2020 Summer Olympics and won a gold medal.

Saili was named in the Black Ferns Sevens squad for the 2022 Commonwealth Games in Birmingham. She won a bronze medal at the event. She was part of the Black Ferns sevens team that won a silver medal at the Rugby World Cup Sevens in Cape Town.

References

External links
 Alena Saili at Black Ferns Sevens
 
 
 
 

1998 births
Living people
Commonwealth Games competitors for New Zealand
Commonwealth Games gold medallists for New Zealand
Commonwealth Games medallists in rugby sevens
Medalists at the 2020 Summer Olympics
New Zealand female rugby sevens players
New Zealand women's international rugby sevens players
New Zealand sportspeople of Samoan descent
Olympic gold medalists for New Zealand
Olympic medalists in rugby sevens
Olympic rugby sevens players of New Zealand
Rugby sevens players at the 2018 Commonwealth Games
Rugby sevens players at the 2020 Summer Olympics
Rugby union players from Porirua
Rugby sevens players at the 2022 Commonwealth Games
Medallists at the 2018 Commonwealth Games
Medallists at the 2022 Commonwealth Games